Varun Choudhary is an Indian cricketer. He made his List A debut for Services in the 2018–19 Vijay Hazare Trophy on 19 September 2018. He made his Twenty20 debut on 9 November 2019, for Services in the 2019–20 Syed Mushtaq Ali Trophy.

References

External links
 

Year of birth missing (living people)
Living people
Indian cricketers
Services cricketers
Place of birth missing (living people)